Scott Charles Stewart is an American filmmaker and visual effects artist. He was one of the principal co-founders of The Orphanage, a prolific Los Angeles effects house that worked on dozens of high-profile projects. As a director, he helmed the dark fantasy action-horror films Legion and Priest, and the alien abduction thriller Dark Skies. He also executive produced the television series Dominion, a sequel to the former film. Stewart has also  directed, produced, and realized dozens of short films  and television commercials.

Biography
Stewart was a senior staffer at the visual effects company The Orphanage. Stewart directed and wrote the apocalyptic thriller Legion. He directed the vampire-western horror film Priest.

Associations
He has used actor Paul Bettany in the lead role on his first two directed features, Legion and Priest.

Filmography
Director

Producer

Visual effects
 Mars Attacks! (1996)
 The Lost World: Jurassic Park (1997)
 Mercury Rising (1998)
 The Last Birthday Card (2000)
 Harry Potter and the Goblet of Fire (2005)
 Sin City (2005)
 Night at the Museum (2006)
 Pirates of the Caribbean: Dead Man's Chest (2006)
 Superman Returns (2006)
 The Host (2006)
 Live Free or Die Hard (2007)
 Pirates of the Caribbean: At World's End (2007)
 Grindhouse (2007)
 Red Cliff (2008)
 You Don't Mess with the Zohan (2008)
 Iron Man (2008)

References

External links

American film directors
American film producers
Special effects people
American male screenwriters
Horror film directors
Living people
Year of birth missing (living people)